In plasma physics, an upper hybrid oscillation is a mode of oscillation of a magnetized plasma. It consists of a longitudinal motion of the electrons perpendicular to the magnetic field with the dispersion relation
,
where (in cgs units)

is the electron plasma frequency, and

is the electron cyclotron frequency.

This oscillation is closely related to the plasma oscillation found in unmagnetized plasmas or parallel to the magnetic field, where the ωpe term arises from the electrostatic Coulomb restoring force and the 3k²ve,th² term arises from the restoring force of electron pressure. In the upper hybrid oscillation there is an additional restoring force due to the Lorentz force. Consider a plane wave where all perturbed quantities vary as exp(i(kx-ωt)). If the displacement in the direction of propagation is δx, then
vx = -iωδ
fy = nevxBz/c = -iω(neBz/c)δ
vy = -fy/iωnm = (eBz/mc)δ
fx = -nevyBz/c = -(nm)(eBz/mc)²δ
ax = -ωce²δ
Thus the perpendicular magnetic field effectively provides a harmonic restoring force with a frequency ωce, explaining the third term in the dispersion relation. The particle orbits (or fluid trajectories) are ellipses in the plane perpendicular to the magnetic field, elongated in the direction of propagation.

The frequency of long wavelength oscillations is a "hybrid", or mix, of the electron plasma and electron cyclotron frequencies,
ωh² = ωpe² + ωce²,
and is known as the upper hybrid frequency. There are also a lower hybrid frequency and lower hybrid oscillations.

For propagation at angles oblique to the magnetic field, two modes exist simultaneously. If the plasma frequency is higher than the cyclotron frequency, then the upper hybrid oscillation transforms continuously into the plasma oscillation. The frequency of the other mode varies between the cyclotron frequency and zero. Otherwise, the frequency of the mode related to the upper hybrid oscillation remains above the cyclotron frequency, and the mode related to the plasma oscillation remains below the plasma frequency. In particular, the frequencies are given by

See also
 Plasma oscillation
 Lower hybrid oscillation
 List of plasma (physics) articles

Waves in plasmas

To derive the dispersion relation of ion cyclotron waves in quantum plasma we use quantum plasma parameters such as fermi temperature,pressure and compensating the debroglie wavelength in quantum plasma.